This is a timeline of bordism, a topological theory based on the concept of the boundary of a manifold. For context see timeline of manifolds. Jean Dieudonné wrote that cobordism returns to the attempt in 1895 to define homology theory using only (smooth) manifolds.

Integral theorems

Cohomology

Homotopy theory

Notes

Algebraic topology
Differential topology
Mathematics timelines